The Ust-Ilimsk Hydroelectric Power Station (Ust-Ilimsk HPS) is a concrete gravity dam on the Angara River and adjacent hydroelectric power station. It is located near Ust-Ilimsk, Irkutsk Oblast in Russia and is the third dam on the Angara cascades. Construction of the dam began in 1963, its reservoir began to fill in 1974, and the power plant was commissioned in 1980.

History

Background
Between 1951 and 1955, construction of the Ust-Ilimsk HPS was designated as a priority and in September 1960, the State Commission determined the most suitable spot for the dam. Gidroproekt All-Union Design and Exploratory Institute produced the design of the HPS and on June 8, 1962, the Central Committee of the CPSU and Ministerial Council of the USSR determined the schedule of construction and the project's scope.

Construction
Construction on Stage I of the HPS began in 1963. This included preparing the dam's foundation, various construction facilities and 220 kV power lines. In addition, the village of Ust-Ilimsk was created as well to support workers on the project. By 1966, the Bratsk-Ust-Ilimsk motorway was opened to traffic and in March of that year, construction began on the actual power plant. On April 22, 1968, the first concrete was poured into the dam's foundation and by October 3, 1974, the dam began to inundate the Angara River, creating its reservoir. The dam was accepted for industrial operation in 1980.

Generation
By 1981, the HPS had generated its first 100 billion kWh which had doubled by 1986 and doubled again by 1995 with 400 billion kWh. By October 1, 2005, it had produced 600 billion kWh of electricity. For comparison, in 2008, U.S. residential and commercial sectors consumed about 517 billion kWh for lighting. On average, the station produces 21.7 billion kWh annually and utilizes its installed capacity for 5,050 hours out of 8,760 a year.

Specifications
The power station is designed to support another two turbines which, if installed, would bring its capacity up to 4,320 MW.

See also

 List of power stations in Russia

References

Hydroelectric power stations built in the Soviet Union
Hydroelectric power stations in Russia
Dams in Russia
Buildings and structures in Irkutsk Oblast
Dams completed in 1974
Dams on the Angara River